S Club 7: Christmas Special is the fourth one-off programme from the British pop group S Club 7. It first aires in 2000 and is produced for CITV. In this TV special, the group are trying to get home to the UK for Christmas and New Year. To pay for flights home, the members all take on low-paying jobs in a local shopping mall. Paul gets in a car accident and loses his memory, with doctors saying he has to stay in LA for Christmas. He later regains his memory.

Cast

S Club 7
 Tina Barrett
 Paul Cattermole
 Jon Lee
 Bradley McIntosh
 Jo O'Meara
 Hannah Spearritt
 Rachel Stevens

References

2000 British television series debuts
2000 British television series endings
British music television shows
British musical television series
ITV children's television shows
S Club 7 television series
Television shows set in Los Angeles